Big Brother 2007, also known as Big Brother 8, was the eighth series of the British reality television series Big Brother. The show followed twenty-three contestants, known as housemates, who were isolated from the outside world for an extended period of time in a custom built House. Each week, one or more of the housemates were eliminated from the competition and left the House. The last remaining housemate, Brian Belo, was declared the winner, winning a cash prize of £100,000 (the second housemate to do so after Liam McGough was awarded the same amount in the third week).

The series launched on Channel 4 on 30 May 2007 and ended on 31 August 2007, lasting 94 days - the longest British edition of Big Brother to date. Davina McCall returned as presenter for her eighth consecutive year. Eleven housemates entered on launch night, with an additional seven men being introduced by the time of the fourth week. The series was watched by an average of 3.9 million viewers, the lowest viewed series of the show at the time.

The first series of Big Brother to air since the highly controversial fifth celebrity series, Big Brother 8 was the subject of viewer complaints and press attention, mainly regarding the ejection of a housemate for the use of a racial slur.

Production

Auditions
The first round of auditions started on 6 January 2007 at the SECC in Glasgow, where there was a queue of three hundred people.

Sponsorship
On 8 March 2007, it was announced that The Carphone Warehouse would not return to sponsor Big Brother 8 after cancelling its sponsorship of Celebrity Big Brother 5, and on 21 March, that Virgin Media would sponsor the show, for a reported £3 million. Virgin Media's idents for the show use footage from Big Brother programmes from all around the world, including Germany, Brazil, Philippines and the Netherlands.

Eye logo
The iconic Big Brother eye has been redesigned to what has been described as a "centrifugal inter-locking RGB rainbow test card" by its designer Daniel Eatock.

Broadcasts
On Channel 4, Davina McCall remained as main host of the live shows such as live launch, evictions, finale and other special shows where there may be a twist taking place. Marcus Bentley returned as narrator of the nightly highlight shows.
For the first time since Big Brother 5 in 2004, there was also no highlight show broadcast on Saturday nights.
In the early years of Big Brother, a live stream would feature on Channel E4, however this was omitted from the schedule until the final series (BB11-2010) Sunday night's highlight show would, instead, show just a handful of footage from Friday, and would instead focus more on Saturday's events in the house.

McCall also hosted Big Brother: On the Couch, a psychology show broadcast on Sunday before the main show. It was similar to Big Brother's Big Brain, which was broadcast the previous year before being axed. It did not return in any subsequent series' of Big Brother.

Dermot O'Leary returned as host Big Brother's Little Brother. On 28 November 2007 he announced his departure from the show. With his last presenting role being in the following Big Brother: Celebrity Hijack in January 2008.

Diary Room Uncut returned in the same time slot as last year. On Fridays, housemates would make podcasts.

Big Brother's Big Mouth returned in the same late night timeslot, however Russell Brand did not return, having quit the show earlier in the year. No permanent replacement was made and instead a different host took control each week.

Ofcom statement
Before the launch programme, Channel 4 presented a statement from Ofcom explaining the racism incidents from Celebrity Big Brother earlier in the year. 

This was followed immediately by a Channel 4 ident, and then the Big Brother titles. Channel 4 also broadcast the Ofcom statement on the morning of 31 May 2007 before the early morning repeat, and again immediately before the first eviction on Friday 15 June.

House
It was initially believed that this would be the last series to be aired from the house in Elstree Studios, with a new house set to be built in Hammersmith for 2008, although, Endemol decided to renew the lease at its current location for another two years.
The layout of the house remained much the same as the previous series, although the kitchen moved to the other side of the main living area. One big theme in the house was annoyance; the kitchen appliances were scattered around the house, with the oven and heat proof surface in the bedroom and the fridge in the garden. As further annoyance, the bathtub was placed in an open space right next to the main living room. Where the oven was in the bedroom was approximately where the kitchen area was located in Big Brother 7.
The bedroom contained a single, double and triple bed as well as two four-person beds. Outside the bedroom window, in the main living area, is a lip shaped sofa that the presenters of the show refer to as "the lips". The house also contains a salon/bathroom, which houses two large hair dryers and two steam suits.

Garden
As well as the kitchen fridge, the garden contained a swimming pool, a seating area and, due to the smoking ban that came into effect in all public places during the series, a smoking area which housemates had to use from Day 1, even though the smoking ban didn't come into play until 1 July. This was checked by health officials, and deemed acceptable. The grass from the previous series has been replaced with AstroTurf. The garden was one of the smallest this year, in comparison to the garden in Big Brother 7.
On Day 25 it was revealed that a caravan was hidden behind a garden wall. The caravan came with two single beds and sleeping bags. Brian and Charley went "on holiday" to the caravan for one night. The caravan was again accessible from day 36, this time any of the housemates were allowed to use the room.
An extension to the pool was revealed on Day 67, along with a bar area. The area was hidden behind the "wet" sign in the garden.
"The Insider" on BBLB revealed that there was a fully functioning washing machine hidden in the garden, throughout the show. Dermot O'Leary revealed this to the housemates during the BBLB reunion show.
Because of the Big Brother 7 water shortage, the garden included a water tower, which at the beginning of the series was full. The water tower was located next to the fridge and the mangle.

Vestibule
Between the entrance/exit stairs and the main house was a vestibule area. This was used for several tasks, rewards and punishments, such as Ziggy's dating task, Amanda and Sam's birthday party, the punishments on Day 43, and the "Sin Bin" which is the room Charley was made to stay in while the rest of the housemates had their sin party.

Diary Room
A corridor was added between the Diary Room door and the main house which changes colour from red to blue to green when the "eye" button to open the door is pressed. The diary room chair was changed to a much larger see-through chair which contains white neon lights. For Big Brother: Celebrity Hijack, the lights inside the chair were coloured purple, to keep up with E4's theme. The diary room resides in almost the same place as last year, but set back a bit, making the living area larger.
As in recent years, the diary room was used for several tasks. The Time Machine from Big Brother's time machine task was in the diary room. It was also used for the Seven Deadly Sins task.

Hidden rooms
The House contained a number of hidden rooms that were accessed either through the diary room or through a store room off the living area. At various points in the show, all or part of these rooms were opened up for various tasks and twists.
One of these rooms was slept in by Thaila Zucchi, in her role as "Pauline", and it was Australia-themed and contained a kangaroo statue, a surfboard, plants and beanbags. The bedroom also contained the dossier from which "Pauline" could find out things about her housemates. Only "Pauline" was allowed in the room at that time.
The rooms were later on used to house five 'halfway housemates' as part of a twist. It included a dormitory, common room, wash room and kitchenette as well as a small garden.
Periodically throughout the series, housemates conducted various tasks in some of these rooms.
For the BBTV task, a newsroom was built, where two housemates transmitted news to the rest of the house, such as messages from home. The rooms were also used as a studio for a gameshow and later a talent show.
It was used as a "The Happy Room" to cheer up Charley and Billi, who were instructed to wear "happy" t-shirts and baseball caps for the duration of their stay. The room was full of red beanbags, and featured cheery slogans on the walls. While in the room, Big Brother played the tune, If You're Happy and You Know It.
During the seven deadly sins task, it was turned into "The Room of Nicky" and contained pictures, books and footage of Nicky and also a sofa with cushions spelling N-I-C-K-Y. Nicky was instructed to stay in the room and learn to appreciate herself until Big Brother allowed her to leave.
For Big Brother's birthday task, a Practice Room was built, where the entertainers had to practice. A party room was then provided with a ball pool, small stage, and an area for food. Amanda and Sam, Gerry, Nicky, and Ziggy were chosen as the party guests. Carole's job was the face painter. Chanelle and Liam performed magic. Charley and Tracey were clowns. Brian was the final musical performer.

Halfway House
On Day 59, five new housemates Amy, Jonty, Shanessa, David and Kara entered the house and were told they would live in the Halfway House which was reached by going through the store room or through the diary room and down a coridoor. The Halfway Housemates and ordinary house mates were swapped around for different reasons.
Day 59
Amy, David, Jonty, Kara and Shanessa enter the Halfway House. David visits the main house.
Day 60
In the morning Amy visits the main house, followed by Jonty in the afternoon.
Day 61
In the morning Shanessa visits the main house, followed by Kara in the afternoon.
Day 62
Housemates in the main house choose David and Kara to enter the house swapped with Ziggy.
Day 63
The Halfway Housemates have a task called Jack in a box to win a place in the main house. Shanessa won and was swapped with Liam who Shanessa chose.
Day 64
The four Halfway housemates had to choose to swap with four housemates in the main house they chose David, Kara, Shanessa and Tracey who moved in halfway house and were automatically faced eviction.
Day 65
The halfway housemates are given a last night to go into the main house for a few hours.
Day 66
The first halfway housemate to be evicted is Shanessa, the second is David. Then Kara and Tracey re-enter the main house for good.

Housemates 

There were a total of 22 housemates in this series of Big Brother. Each week, two or more housemates were nominated to be evicted by the general public until the winner was left. All of the housemates that entered on the first day were female, then on the third day; a male housemate – Ziggy – entered the house. On 7 June 2007 it was announced on Big Brother's Big Mouth that Day 10 would see the addition of two male housemates, in replacement of the cancelled eviction. These two housemates were Gerry and Seány. On 15 June, four new male housemates entered the house. They were Billi, Jonathan, Liam, and Brian. Jonathan left on Day 35 due to a family death from day 34 that he wanted to attend to.

The series was eventually won by housemate Brian Belo on 31 August 2007, with twin housemates Sam and Amanda polling second place, and housemate Liam in third. The main eye colour featured this year was multi-coloured. A new housemate called "Pauline" entered the house on 8 July, supposedly from Big Brother Australia, however, her true identity was actress Thaila Zucchi, and worked as a mole for Big Brother, before being removed on Day 42. Five new housemates, Amy, Jonty, Shanessa, David & Kara entered the house in a separate room called Halfway House on Day 59. Rylan Clark, who would go on to appear in Celebrity Big Brother 11, was scheduled to be a surprise housemate during this series, passing the auditions and waiting in hiding to enter the house. However, the day before he was due to enter, his identity was leaked in the press.

Notes

Weekly summary

Nominations table

Notes

: As the only male housemate, only Ziggy was eligible to nominate this week. The eviction was later cancelled due to Emily being ejected.
: This week, new housemates Seány and Gerry were two of four housemates allowed to nominate, and together had to choose the other two housemates to nominate with them. They chose Sam and Amanda.
: As punishment for discussing nominations, Billi and Charley's nominations were voided by Big Brother. Had this not happened Charley and Nicky would have faced the public vote with them.
: Week 6 was Fake Week, and the "eviction" on Day 45 had the "evicted" housemate, Charley, interviewed by Davina - with the interview shown on the plasma screen in the house - and then put back in the house.
: As punishment for discussing nominations, Chanelle and Ziggy were only allowed to nominate one housemate each.
: After continuous swapping of housemates between the Main House and the Halfway House, the housemates remaining in the Halfway House automatically faced the public vote, in which there was a double eviction.
: Amanda and Sam chose to become one housemate on Day 69. However, as a result they both automatically faced eviction. As well as finding out that they were nominated, Amy, Jonty and Kara-Louise were also able to see who nominated who.
: For Week 11's shopping task those who won mini-tasks gained "guru status" and were immune from eviction. All other housemates automatically faced the public vote. The Gurus had to decide from the two housemates with the highest number of votes (Carole with 49% & Gerry with 24%) whom to evict. The Gurus unanimously decided to evict Gerry.
: In Week 12, there was a double eviction. As such, the three or more housemates with the most nominations faced the public vote. 
: There were no nominations in the final week. The public were voting for the housemate they wanted to win, rather than evict.

Ratings

Official ratings are taken from BARB.

Criticism and controversy

Racist language
Nine days into the series, Channel 4 was criticised for deciding to air the word "nigger" on their daily highlights show. After the criticism they received for not handling the Celebrity Big Brother racism allegations properly back in January, they were quick to intervene after Emily used the word in conversation with Charley. On the other hand, Charley and Nicky subsequently used the same contentious word several times, in reference to Emily's use. No action was seen to be taken against them. After Emily's disqualification from the competition was announced, 922 viewers complained to Ofcom, the British television regulator, believing that it was unfair. Another 270 people expressed dissatisfaction with Channel 4's decision to air the word "nigger" uncensored. Parr was invited on BBLB, which also caused disturbances, but postponed her appearance. The press and Dermot presumed she postponed due to the controversy, but as she revealed in her BBLB interview, it was not.

Furthermore, on Day 40, Channel 4 confirmed that Charley had been called to the Diary Room and reprimanded after using the word "nigger" twice on one night. This was not broadcast on the nightly highlights programme or the live feed, further inflaming rumours about favouritism towards Charley. A Big Brother spokesperson claimed "Charley used the N-word as a black woman to refer to another black person. We judged her use of the term different from Emily's. But Big Brother called her to the Diary Room to remind her that this word could cause offence."

References

External links
 Big Brother 8 at Channel4.com

2007 British television seasons
 8
Television shows shot at Elstree Film Studios